The Community Security Trust (CST) is a British charity whose purpose is to provide safety, security, and advice to the Jewish community in the UK. It provides advice, training, representation and research.

Founding and mission
The Community Security Trust grew out of the Community Security Organisation, which became independent of the Board of Deputies of British Jews in 1986. It was registered as a charity in 1994 and has a mission to provide safety, security, and advice to the Jewish community in the UK.  The CST's mission statement says, "To work at all times for the physical protection of British Jews." The CST began recording antisemitic incidents in 1984.

Structure
The group's founding chairman is the British businessman Gerald Ronson, and its deputy chairman is Lloyd Dorfman. The chief executive of the CST is Mark Gardner, who was previously the Director of Communications. Dave Rich is the Director of Policy at CST.

The CST has four offices, over 90 employees and a network of several thousand volunteers from all parts of the Jewish community, who work closely with the police, including for joint patrols, advisory, and training.

Activities
The organisation's philosophy is that the Jewish community is responsible for its own security. It works closely with police services around the country and is recognised by government and police as a "unique model of best practice."

The CST provides security advice and training for Jewish schools, synagogues and communal organisations and gives assistance to those bodies that are affected by antisemitism. The CST also assists and supports individual members of the Jewish community who have been affected by antisemitism and antisemitic incidents. It advises and represents the Jewish community on matters of antisemitism, terrorism and security and works with police, government and international bodies. All this work is provided at no charge.

In 2012, the CST provided the model for a new anti-Islamophobia project, Tell MAMA (run by interfaith organisation Faith Matters), with which it now works closely.

Research
The CST has recorded antisemitic incidents in the UK since 1984 and publishes an annual Antisemitic Incidents Report. The CST also published Terrorist Incidents against Jewish Communities and Israeli Citizens Abroad 1968-2010, a definitive report of terrorist attacks against Jewish communities around the world.

In 2003, the charity worked with the Board of Deputies of British Jews to submit a report concerning Iran and antisemitism to the Foreign Affairs Select Committee.

In 2008, CST published its first Antisemitic Discourse Report, an annual study of antisemitic discourse in mainstream media and politics in the UK. From 2008 to 2012, it published advisory reports on voting tactics in British elections to minimise the impact of far-right groups such as the British National Party (BNP).

In 2020, the charity released a report on rising antisemitic incidents in universities named Campus Antisemitism in Britain 2018–2020. It provided advice to universities on how to respond to reports of antisemitism. The report was debated in the House of Lords in January 2021.

Online abuse 
The CST has been active in monitoring and attempting to combat extremist activity online.

In 2019, the CST recorded 1,805 incidents of antisemitic abuse, 697 of which were online. The group considered it likely that Gaza-Israel tensions and turmoil within the UK's Labour Party contributed in part to an increase in such incidents.

During the COVID-19 pandemic, the CST reported in 2020 that it had recorded a drop in physical assaults on Jewish people in the UK, but had noted an increase in online abuse, including antisemitic conspiracy theories accusing Jewish people of engineering the pandemic as a "hoax" or spreading COVID-19, among other antisemitic content. The charity had also said that it noticed far-right commentators online discussing spreading COVID-19 to synagogues.

The CST has released reports detailing content it considers harmful on certain alt-tech platforms such as Parler, BitChute, and Gab. The CST stated that the website BitChute was hosting videos from National Action, a neo-Nazi terrorist group in the UK. The Guardian reported that CST's analysis discovered posts on Telegram which "...celebrat[ed] Thomas Mair and David Copeland, and other far-right terrorists." In early 2021, the CST reported the website BitChute to Ofcom for content it considered antisemitic, hateful, and extremist. The CST has scrutinized other platforms such as Facebook and Twitter for antisemitic content.

The charity was among the groups that worked with TikTok to develop a Holocaust education initiative launched in early 2021.

After the storming of the Capitol in the United States in January 2021, the CST warned that calls for similar events to take place in the United Kingdom, including a proposed storming of Parliament or Downing Street, were appearing in far-right spaces online.

Funding and finances
In May 2014, the Jewish Chronicle reported that the former chief executive of the CST, Richard Benson, (who had stepped down from the position in 2013) was one of the highest paid charity leaders within the British Jewish community, earning £170,000-£190,000 per annum. The charity had an annual turnover of £7.34 million (making it one of the larger UK Jewish charities) and 63 employees.

As of 2020, the CST, led by new chief executive Mark Gardner, had 92 staff members, one of whom was paid at a similar rate of £170,000-£179,000 per annum, according to the charity regulator, the Charity Commission for England and Wales.

Beginning in 2015, the UK government's Home Office has provided 'The Jewish Community Protective Security Grant' for the security of synagogues, schools and other Jewish centres, with the CST as the Grant Recipient. Home Secretary Sajid Javid pledged to increase funding, bringing the total amount allocated from 2015 to 2019 to £65.2 million. In 2020, the grant was renewed, and the CST received £14 million in funding for protecting the security of the Jewish community and its institutions. As of 2020, the CST had 1,500 volunteers.

Criticism
In 2011, a number of articles appeared in the British weekly newspaper The Jewish Chronicle that  questioned the work and functioning of the CST. Gilbert Kahn, of Kean University in the US, took the view that British Jewry did not need a CST because British Jews paid taxes to the state for their physical protection and could therefore depend on the police. On 15 April, the newspaper's columnist Geoffrey Alderman argued against the CST on the grounds that its leadership and funding were neither transparent nor accountable. Alderman returned to the subject on 10 June, when he speculated that his doubts about the CST and its work were more widely shared.

In July 2015, Alderman devoted his column to the retirement of the CST's Director of Security, Carol Laser. Alderman speculated on the reason for her retirement and questioned whether it was wise that she had agreed to have her identity revealed, considering that the nature of her work would have made enemies.

See also
Campaign Against Antisemitism
Shomrim (neighborhood watch group)

Notes

External links
Official website

Antisemitism in the United Kingdom
Jewish charities based in the United Kingdom
Organizations established in 1994
1994 establishments in the United Kingdom
Opposition to antisemitism in the United Kingdom